The Concordat Prison (in Spanish, Cárcel Concordatoria) refers to the prison that the Francoist State in Spain operated for dissident Catholic priests. It was located in Zamora.

References 

Defunct prisons in Spain
Francoist Spain
Buildings and structures in Zamora, Spain
1968 establishments in Spain
Catholicism and politics